Carrigaphooca Stone Circle is a stone circle and National Monument located in County Cork, Ireland.

Location

History

Stone circles of this type were erected in Ireland in the middle/late Bronze Age (c. 1700–800 BC).

The name means "stone of the púca" (ghost or fairy).

Description
There were five stones: four standing and one inclined, but now only three remain.

References

National Monuments in County Cork
Megalithic monuments in Ireland